Vogel House in 75 Woburn Road, Lower Hutt, New Zealand is a large family home built in 1933 for James and Jocelyn Vogel. It was designed by Heathcote Helmore of the Christchurch architectural firm of Helmore and Cotterill, and built by Walter Dyer of the Lower Hutt firm of Dyer and Halse. Vogel House was presented to the Government as the official residence for the Prime Minister while he was in Wellington, and was used for that purpose from 1977 to 1990. Vogel House was listed by the New Zealand Historic Places Trust (since renamed to Heritage New Zealand) as a Category I historic place in 2008.

History
The land that belongs to Vogel House (about two acres) was initially owned by a series of prominent settlers with connection to the New Zealand Company, and had been used as a poultry farm. One of them, James Kelham, had a cottage built in the 1870s or 1880s, and the building is these days the gatehouse. The cottage is possibly the oldest dwelling in Lower Hutt; more than 100 years old in 1987. 

The property changed hands numerous times until it was purchased by James and Jocelyn Vogel in 1932. Jocelyn Vogel (née Riddiford) was the daughter of Vivian Riddiford (1879–1934) of Woburn, Lower Hutt, and the great grand niece of Governor Sir George Grey. In 1932 she had married James (Jim) Vogel. James Vogel was the grandson of Premier Sir Julius Vogel (1835–1899) and the great grandson of Premier James FitzGerald.

As early as 1963 the Vogels were making overtures to the Government to present the house to the nation as an Official Residence for the Prime Minister. Much was also made of the fact that the property was gifted in the centennial year of parliamentary government in Wellington, given the role that the ancestors of the Vogels had played its formation. The government accepted the offer on 13 July 1965 with one of the conditions being that the Vogels could remain in the property until their deaths.

As the Government did not expect that the property would come into their possession for a number of years, little thought was given to the future use of the building. At one point there was an idea that the house and grounds could be turned into a New Zealand Administration College, the extensive grounds providing ample room to construct the necessary buildings. However, in 1966 the Vogels decided to leave the house for family reasons and retire to their residence in the Marlborough Sounds. This left the Government searching for a use for the property.

The Vogels suggested that the Australian High Commission, who were looking for a temporary residency, would be a suitable tenant, and by mid 1966 the Government had entered into discussions with the Vogels over this proposed new use for the building. The Australian High Commission were known to be keen to secure the Vogel property as it adjoined the temporary American Embassy and the residence of the United Kingdom trade commissioner adjoined the Vogel House property. From 1967 to 1976 the house was occupied by the Australian High Commission.

Since 1977 the house has been used as the official residence of the Prime Minister of New Zealand, when Robert Muldoon renovated it, entertaining the Queen there in February 1977. However, his successor David Lange preferred to live in central Wellington, in a rented flat close to Parliament.

Since 1990 the Official Residence of the Prime Minister has once again been Premier House in Tinakori Road. Vogel House was used by the Governor-General from 2008 to 2012 while Government House was being renovated.

On 27 June 2008, the New Zealand Historic Places Trust listed Vogel House as a Category I historic place for "its outstanding historical significance".

Legal battle over ownership

In 2014, the Commissioner of Crown Lands decided the property was no longer needed.  To this end, he initiated a disposal process under the Land Act 1948.  This decision was challenged by two grandsons of James and Jocelyn Vogel, Tim and Geoff Vogel, on the grounds that their grandparents always intended to leave it to them.   In June 2017 the Crown changed its mind and decided to sell the house with the proceeds going to the Crown consolidated fund.  This decision was challenged by the grandsons in the High Court on the grounds that the Crown had not considered the emotional hardship they would suffer if the property was not offered to them.  The High Court decided in favour of the grandsons, determining that the Crown decision contained a material error of law and ordered the Crown to reconsider its decision. In November 2019 the house was sold to the Vogel family.

The Commissioner initially estimated the disposal costs of the property to be less than $20,000.  However, the actual disposal costs were at least 10 times this amount.  Additionally, the disposal process took more than 6 years.

References

External links
Housing the Prime Minister 
 Vogel House (Heritage NZ website) 
Main Foyer (Photo on National Library website) 
Drawing Room (Photo on National Library website)

Buildings and structures in Lower Hutt
Official residences in New Zealand
Prime ministerial residences
Houses in New Zealand
Heritage New Zealand Category 1 historic places in the Wellington Region
1930s architecture in New Zealand